The Fairmount Congregational Church in Wichita, Kansas is a historic church at 1650 N. Fairmont.  It was built in 1910 and added to the National Register in 2006.

It is Richardsonian Romanesque in style.  When it was built in 1910, its south wing incorporated an earlier church on the site, the Mayflower Congregational Church, which had been built in 1887 and had been moved to this site in 1907.

References

External links

Official website

Churches on the National Register of Historic Places in Kansas
Romanesque Revival church buildings in Kansas
Churches completed in 1910
Churches in Wichita, Kansas
National Register of Historic Places in Wichita, Kansas